is a Japanese light novel series by Kaya Kizaki, with illustrations by Itsuki Akata. As of March 2011, thirteen volumes have been published by Shueisha under their Super Dash Bunko imprint. An anime adaptation by Studio Deen aired in 2011.

Plot
The series revolves around Ryūji Kisaragi, a seemingly ordinary teenager who is living a peaceful life while also attending high school. However, his peaceful life gets interrupted after his second cousin, Eriko returns from abroad. With no time to waste, Eriko drags Ryūji to a black marketing organization called Fang, led by an evil black dragon named Onyx. They steal a large relic box from the criminals.

After opening the box, Eriko and Ryūji find a young, girl-like dragon with long, blonde hair and sparkling blue eyes. The girl instantly recognizes Ryūji and becomes attracted to him. They decide to name the girl Rose, due to the rose-like pattern on her left hand. Suddenly, the very same organization who kept Rose captive arrive to take her back. But Ryūji is not ready to let her go without a fight!

From that moment on, Ryūji and Eriko embark on an unexpected yet exciting adventure as they strive to protect Rose from Fang and other evil people who are after her. Ryūji relies on his powers as a Level 10 breaker to fend these bad guys off. On the way, they meet other dragons who share troubled relationships with each other along with a research group called the Society. Also, Ryūji comes face to face with a truth long kept hidden from him since his birth.

Characters

Ryūji is 15 years old. His parents are Lost Precious hunters like the rest of his family and since they are often away from home, he lives mostly on his own. At first, he cannot explain why Rose knows him; however, he eventually remembers a vague memory of seeing Rose hatch from her egg when he was much younger and her saving him from an untimely death. Ryūji is a Level 10 Breaker, the most skilled of those who search for and use Lost Precious'. Besides Ryūji, there are only seven other Level 10 breakers in the world, all older than he is. As the story progresses, Ryūji is recognized by some of the dragons as Rose's fiancé, although this is due to a misunderstanding. Ryūji has feelings for Rose and does care about her. This is evident when he first "Engaged" with Rose, which allowed him to borrow Rose's power and achieve unbelievable power. Ryūji begins to feel embarrassed around Rose after he performs the dragon's coming of age ceremony with Rose (a simple kiss on the dragon scale birthmark on her hand). According to Onyx, Ryūji is not human, but the corporeal form of a Lost Precious called "Dragon Crisis" that can exert a great influence over dragons, thus he is able to wield the Lost Precious "Slash Breath" - a powerful weapon made from a dragon tooth and feared by all dragons. Onyx also claims that this is the reason why Rose became weaker after performing the coming of age ceremony with him. This is later proven to be false by Maruga. After Onyx is defeated, he returns to school life alongside his friends.

Notably, Ryūji means "Dragon Ruler", in Japanese.

Little is known about Rose beyond the fact that she is a young dragon, and thus still unable to change form. Prior to the series, she is captured and sealed in a relic box by the crime syndicate Fang. While transporting the case (presumably to their leader Onyx), Ryūji and Eriko steal it from them and release her. She knows nothing but Ryūji's name, but soon picks up a few words. Since she is unable to communicate at first, Ryūji gives her the name Rose because the dragon scales on the back of her left hand resemble a rose. Rose is aggressive towards nearly everyone except Ryūji, to whom she clings, even insisting on sleeping beside him in his bed. She deeply loves Ryūji, but is unsure of his feelings for her. Rose and Ryūji first met when he was young. He found her when she hatched from her egg and Eriko believes that she fell in love with him at first sight. Later, some of the dragons acknowledged Ryūji as Rose's fiancé due to misunderstanding of the term "Engage". After Ryūji kisses her birthmark as part of her coming of age ritual, Rose becomes flustered and embarrassed around him. When she becomes inexplicably weaker after the ritual. Onyx claims that it is because Ryūji is the corporeal form of the Lost Precious "Dragon Crisis". In the final episode, Maruga reveals that this was a lie and that Rose was sick because her intense feelings for Ryūji manifested themselves physically. Following Onyx's defeat, she now attends school alongside Ryūji.

Ryūji's busty 19-year-old second cousin and a Level 7 Breaker. She has been studying abroad for some time, but returns to Japan to intercept a Lost Precious that Fang will be transporting through the city docks. Despite the danger of taking anything that Fang believes is theirs, she does not back down because she believes the contents, which she suspects to be an S rank Lost Precious, will prove her worth to the other Lost Precious hunters, but what was in the case is actually a young girl that would later be named Rose. Initially unable to identify what or who Rose is, she is shocked when she discovers that Rose is a Red Dragon. She wields a staff that can create luminescent butterflies or fireflies, which can blind or stun opponents. Following the defeat of the evil black dragon Onyx, she attends school along with Ryūji and Rose.

Ryūji's classmate. She has feelings for Ryūji, but is shy whenever she is around him, making it hard for her to approach him casually and express her feelings. Also, she has little to no success in getting his attention. She is in shock after misunderstanding Ryūji and Rose being engaged, but is nevertheless supportive towards them. At the end of the series, she still makes attempts to win Ryūji over.

A dragon whom Ryuji' meets during his trip to the beach. She is the princess of the ice dragons. Initially, she has a haughty attitude towards Ryuji, but she warms up towards him. It is implied that she likes Ryuji, as she blushes when Ryuji is around. She asks Ryuji for a favor - to take a cursed Lost Precious from another Level 10 Breaker, George Evans. After the incident, she shows up in the last two episodes of the anime, where she convinces Ryuji to go save Rose after Onyx tricks him into handing her over. Since the black dragon, Onyx, used to live in her land, they have known each other since childhood. Following Onyx's defeat at the hands of Ryūji and Rose, she starts attending school with Ryūji and his friends.

She is 15 years old and is a famous thief of Lost Preciouses, called Odd Eye (because of her one golden eye). Her tattoo is really a Lost Precious which allows her to transform into a half-wolf. Furumori (Ai's master) placed it inside her as an experiment in integrating a person and a Lost Precious. She was taken from her home by Furumori and grew up believing that her family was dead and that she was born a half-wolf. She later finds out that Furumori lied to her with the help of a Lost Precious that allows her to hear a person's true thoughts and rebels against him before he dies in battle against Ryuji, who then reveals that she was only a tool to him; Ai shows pity for him before his death. After her story arc, she finds and returns to her real parents after learning from the Society that they are still alive, but also chooses to keep her abilities. She likes Ryuji for saving her from her life of thievery as well as accepting her unusual appearance and continues to visit him in later episodes. After she and her friends defeat Onyx, she attends school alongside them. Her birthname is Aika. 

Onyx is a black dragon who uses black magic and is the main antagonist. He claims to be Rose's fiancé, but only wishes to marry her for his own gain. He is the leader of the crime syndicate Fang. In the final episode, he is killed by Ryūji and Rose's powerful magic that they unleash upon kissing each other.

A blue dragon girl. She has lived with Onyx since hatching five years previously. She is jealous of Rose for taking the attention of Onyx away from her. She is also Onyx's fiancée; however, Onyx doesn't like her as much as Rose. She has power over water, but has very little control over it, so her attempts to use water typically end up backfiring on her. Sometime after befriending Rose, she secretly betrays Onyx. After Onyx's defeat, she attends school along with Ryūji, Rose, Maruga, Eriko, Bianca, and Ai. 

Kai
Onyx's assistant. She is very calm in most situations and loyal to her boss. Following Onyx's defeat, she becomes Ryuji's new teacher.

Bianca Alexandra Lou
Bianca is a young scientist who works for the Society. She comes to Ryuji's school to evaluate him and later befriends him. She is also a big fan of Ryuji's parents. In the final episode, she starts attending school alongside Ryūji and his friends.

Furumori
A criminal and Ai's master, who is hunted by the Society. He also goes by the name Saiki and possesses five Lost Preciouses. Prior to the events of the series, he kidnaps Ai, uses a Lost Precious to turn her into a half-wolf, and trains her into becoming a thief, all while lying to her that her family has died and that she was born as a half-wolf. He only pretended to care for her so that he can use her for his own gain. Once she learns that truth, she turns on him and after being defeated, he commits suicide by dissolving into the atmosphere. 

George Evans
A Level 10 Breaker who considers all dragons to be a threat, even though he had never seen one personally. After being freed from a cursed Lost Precious, he finally lets go of his hatred of dragons. He has feelings for Maruga.

Tokura
A Society researcher who studies dragons and Lost Preciouses. He is good friends with Ryuji and Eriko.

Masato
One of Ryuji's classmates.

Mao
Another one of Ryuji's classmates. She always tries to help Masaki win over Ryuji.

Anime
Dragon Crisis! was adapted into a 12-episode anime television series by Studio Deen under the direction of Hideki Tachibana and with screenplay by Hideyuki Kurata. The series began its broadcast run on Chiba TV on January 11, 2011 and was scheduled to end on March 29, 2011. However, the last three episodes were temporarily put on hold after a 9.0 earthquake and tsunami struck Japan on March 11. The series was rebroadcast by Chukyo TV, KIDS STATION, Tochigi TV, Tokyo MX, TV Kanagawa, TV Saitama and Yomiuri TV days later and simulcast by Crunchyroll to audiences in Australia, Europe, North America, and South America.

Episode list

Music

Notes

References

External links
Light novel official website - archive April 23, 2011 
Anime official website

2007 Japanese novels
2011 anime television series debuts
2011 Japanese television series endings
Action anime and manga
Anime and manga based on light novels
Light novels
Studio Deen
Romantic comedy anime and manga
Super Dash Bunko
Shueisha franchises
Tokyo MX original programming
Yomiuri Telecasting Corporation original programming